The 2016 Masters Tournament was the 80th edition of the Masters Tournament, held April 7–10 at Augusta National Golf Club in Augusta, Georgia. Danny Willett won his first major championship, three strokes ahead of runners-up Lee Westwood and defending champion Jordan Spieth. Spieth suffered one of the biggest collapses in Masters history. Spieth led the tournament from the first round and built a five-shot lead going to the back nine on Sunday, but lost six shots to par over the next three holes culminating in a quadruple-bogey on the 12th hole where he hit two balls into Rae's Creek. Willett shot a bogey-free 67 to overtake Spieth when the leader faltered on the back nine. Willett became the first European to win the Masters since 1999, and the first Englishman to do so since Nick Faldo in 1996.

This was the final Masters appearance for former champion Tom Watson.

Course

The course was formerly a plant nursery and each hole on the course is named after the tree or shrub with which it has become associated.

Field
The Masters has the smallest field of the four major championships. Officially, the Masters remains an invitation event, but there is a set of qualifying criteria that determines who is included in the field. Each player is classified according to the first category by which he qualified, with other categories in which he qualified shown in parentheses.

Golfers who qualify based solely on their performance in amateur tournaments (categories 6–10) must remain amateurs on the starting day of the tournament to be eligible to play.

1. Past Masters Champions
Ángel Cabrera, Trevor Immelman, Zach Johnson (3,11,13,16,17,18), Bernhard Langer, Sandy Lyle, Phil Mickelson (3,11,17,18), Larry Mize, Mark O'Meara, Charl Schwartzel (15,17,18), Adam Scott (12,15,17,18), Vijay Singh, Jordan Spieth (2,11,12,13,14,15,16,17,18), Bubba Watson (15,16,17,18), Tom Watson, Mike Weir, Ian Woosnam
Fred Couples, José María Olazábal, and Tiger Woods (5) did not play due to injuries.
The following past champions did not enter: Tommy Aaron, Jack Burke Jr., Charles Coody, Ben Crenshaw, Nick Faldo, Raymond Floyd, Doug Ford, Bob Goalby, Jack Nicklaus, Arnold Palmer, Gary Player, Craig Stadler, Fuzzy Zoeller.  Nicklaus, Palmer, and Player served as "honorary starters", though only Nicklaus and Player teed off on the first day at the first hole to kick off the tournament.

2. Last five U.S. Open Champions
Martin Kaymer (5,17,18), Rory McIlroy (3,4,11,15,16,17,18), Justin Rose (11,14,15,16,17,18), Webb Simpson

3. Last five British Open Champions
Darren Clarke, Ernie Els

4. Last five PGA Champions
Keegan Bradley, Jason Day (13,14,15,16,17,18), Jason Dufner (15)

5. Last three winners of The Players Championship
Rickie Fowler (11,15,16,17,18)

6. Top two finishers in the 2015 U.S. Amateur
Derek Bard (a), Bryson DeChambeau (a)

7. Winner of the 2015 Amateur Championship
Romain Langasque (a)

8. Winner of the 2015 Asia-Pacific Amateur Championship
Jin Cheng (a)

9. Winner of the 2016 Latin America Amateur Championship
Paul Chaplet (a)

10. Winner of the 2015 U.S. Mid-Amateur
Sammy Schmitz (a)

11. The top 12 finishers and ties in the 2015 Masters Tournament
Paul Casey (16,17,18), Bill Haas (16,17,18), Charley Hoffman (16), Dustin Johnson (12,16,17,18), Hunter Mahan, Hideki Matsuyama (15,16,17,18), Ryan Moore (18), Kevin Na (16,17,18), Ian Poulter, Kevin Streelman

12. Top 4 finishers and ties in the 2015 U.S. Open
Branden Grace (14,17,18), Louis Oosthuizen (13,16,17,18), Cameron Smith

13. Top 4 finishers and ties in the 2015 British Open Championship
Marc Leishman (17,18)

14. Top 4 finishers and ties in the 2015 PGA Championship

15. Winners of PGA Tour events that award a full-point allocation for the FedEx Cup, between the 2015 Masters Tournament and the 2016 Masters Tournament
Steven Bowditch (16), Fabián Gómez, Emiliano Grillo (17,18), Jim Herman, Smylie Kaufman, Chris Kirk, Kevin Kisner (16,17,18), Russell Knox (17,18), Danny Lee (16,17,18), David Lingmerth (18), Davis Love III, Shane Lowry (17,18), Graeme McDowell, Troy Merritt, Brandt Snedeker (16,17,18), Vaughn Taylor, Justin Thomas (17,18)

Jim Furyk (16,17,18) was unable to compete due to wrist surgery.

16. All players qualifying for the 2015 edition of The Tour Championship
Daniel Berger, Harris English, J. B. Holmes (17,18), Brooks Koepka (17,18), Matt Kuchar (17,18), Scott Piercy (17,18), Patrick Reed (17,18), Henrik Stenson (17,18), Robert Streb (17), Jimmy Walker (17,18)
Bae Sang-moon was unable to compete due to a military obligation in South Korea.

17. Top 50 on the final 2015 Official World Golf Ranking list
An Byeong-hun (18), Kiradech Aphibarnrat (18), Jamie Donaldson, Victor Dubuisson (18), Matt Fitzpatrick (18), Sergio García (18), Billy Horschel (18), Thongchai Jaidee (18), Søren Kjeldsen (18), Anirban Lahiri (18), Andy Sullivan (18), Lee Westwood, Bernd Wiesberger (18), Danny Willett (18), Chris Wood (18)

18. Top 50 on the Official World Golf Ranking list on March 28, 2016
Rafa Cabrera-Bello

19. International invitees
None

Appearing in their first Masters were Kiradech Aphibarnrat, Daniel Berger, Rafa Cabrera-Bello, Fabián Gómez, Emiliano Grillo, Jim Herman, Smylie Kaufman, Kevin Kisner, Russell Knox, David Lingmerth, Troy Merritt, Cameron Smith, Andy Sullivan, Justin Thomas, and all six amateurs. Four of the amateurs (Bard, Chaplet, Cheng and Schmitz) were appearing in their first major.  In addition, An Byeong-hun, Matt Fitzpatrick, and Danny Lee appeared in their first Masters as professionals. Tom Watson was playing in his final Masters event.

Par 3 contest
Wednesday, April 6, 2016

Jimmy Walker won the par 3 contest with a score of 19 (−8), a new tournament record. Nine holes-in-one were made, surpassing the previous record of five set in 2002 and 2015. The players to record an ace were: Rickie Fowler, Zach Johnson, Smylie Kaufman, David Lingmerth, Gary Player, Webb Simpson, Andy Sullivan, Justin Thomas, and Walker.

Round summaries

First round
Thursday, April 7, 2016

Defending champion Jordan Spieth shot a 6-under-par 66 to take a two-shot lead over Danny Lee and Shane Lowry. His bogey-free round was his ninth consecutive Masters round of par or better. World number one Jason Day was 5-under-par through the front nine but shot 5-over-par on the back nine, including a triple-bogey on the 16th hole, to end at even-par. Ernie Els scored a record-worst nine on the first hole after taking six putts from within three feet and ended his round at 8-over-par. The course played difficult due to windy conditions and the scoring average for the field was 74.16.

Second round
Friday, April 8, 2016

Jordan Spieth led by as many as five shots but then carded four bogeys and a double bogey and needed a 14-foot par save at the 18th to preserve a one-shot advantage over Rory McIlroy. This was Spieth's sixth consecutive round with the lead at the Masters, tying the record set by Arnold Palmer in 1960–61. Amateur Bryson DeChambeau got to within a shot of the lead but suffered a triple bogey at the last to finish at even-par. Gusting winds led to difficult scoring conditions, with only four players (Daniel Berger, Dustin Johnson, McIlroy, and Troy Merritt) shooting under par, each shooting 71. The scoring average for the round was 75.02, the highest since 2007 and only seven golfers were under par after two rounds. Tom Watson missed the cut in his 43rd and final Masters.

Amateurs: DeChambeau (E), Langasque (+3), Bard (+9), Schmitz (+12), Cheng (+13), Chaplet (+21)

Third round
Saturday, April 9, 2016

Jordan Spieth held the lead at the Masters for the seventh consecutive round, a new tournament record, and the third straight year after 54 holes. After a double bogey at the 11th, Spieth rebounded with birdies on three of his next four holes to take a four-shot lead, but then bogeyed the 17th and carded another double bogey on the 18th to post 73 (+1) and drop the lead to one. Smylie Kaufman recorded the lowest score of the round with 69 (−3) and moved into second place. Two-time champion Bernhard Langer, at age 58 attempting to become the oldest major champion, shot a round of 70 and tied Hideki Matsuyama for third, two shots back of Spieth. Rory McIlroy entered the round a shot out of the lead but failed to make a birdie and carded 77 (+5).

Final round
Sunday, April 10, 2016

Summary
Danny Willett came back from five shots down at the start of the back nine to win his first major title. Jordan Spieth birdied his final four holes of the front-nine to open up a five-shot advantage. After bogeys at the 10th and 11th, Spieth put two balls in the water on the par-3 12th and made quadruple bogey, dropping him to a tie for fourth. Willett, meanwhile, made birdie at 13 and 14 to take the lead. Lee Westwood chipped in for eagle at the 15th to get within one of Willett, but then made bogey on 16 while Willett made birdie. Willett made par on the last two holes to post a round of 67 and five-under for the tournament.

After rebounding with birdies on 13 and 15, Spieth needed to birdie two of his last three holes to tie but missed an  birdie at 16 then bogeyed 17 to fall out of contention. Spieth's downfall in the final round capped one of the biggest collapses in Masters history, with many comparing it to the meltdown of Greg Norman at the 1996 Masters. Dustin Johnson also made birdie on 13 and 15 to get within two of Willett, but made double bogey on the 17th. Smylie Kaufman began the round a shot out of the lead but shot 81 (+9) and finished in 29th. For the first time in Masters history, three players (Shane Lowry, Davis Love III, and Louis Oosthuizen) made a hole-in-one on the par-3 16th.

Final leaderboard

Scorecard

Cumulative tournament scores, relative to par

Notes

References

External links

Coverage on the PGA Tour's official site
Coverage on the European Tour's official site
Coverage from the PGA of America

2016
2016 in golf
2016 in American sports
2016 in sports in Georgia (U.S. state)
April 2016 sports events in the United States